The Men’s field hockey Qualifying Tournament for the 2012 Summer Olympics are qualification tournaments to determine the final three spots for the 2012 Summer Olympics. The qualifying tournaments, which involve 18 teams divided into three groups, with three separate qualifying tournaments, are to be held in India, Ireland and Japan, at different times in 2012. Only the winners of each qualifying tournament earn a berth in the 2012 Summer Olympics.

India qualified to Olympics after beating France 8–1 in first qualifying tournament, while South Korea qualified after beating Ireland 3–2 in the second qualifying tournament. South Africa qualified after they beat Japan 2-1 in the third qualifying tournament.

Teams
Below is the list of 18 teams who participate in these qualifying tournaments:

 – Replaced by Italy
 – Replaced by Brazil
 – Replaced by Singapore
 – South Africa played in qualifying tournament, then gave up automatic berth which was given to Spain.

Qualifying 1

Qualifying 1 was held from February 18 to February 25, 2012 in New Delhi, India.

Pool

Classification round

Fifth place game

Third place game

Final

Awards
Best Player:  Sardar Singh
Best Goalkeeper:  Mariusz Chyla
Top Goalscorer:  Sandeep Singh (16 goals)
Fair Play:

Final standings

Qualifying 2

Qualifying 2 was held from March 10 to March 18, 2012 in Dublin, Ireland.

Pool

Classification round

Fifth place game

Third place game

Final

Awards
Topscorer:  Razie Rahim,  Timothy Cockram,  Lee Nam-Yong (6 goals)
Best Player:  You Hyo-Sik

Final standings

Qualifying 3
Qualifying 3 was held from April 26 to May 6, 2012 in Kakamigahara, Japan.

Venue
Gifu-ken Green Stadium

Pool

Classification

Fifth and sixth

Third and fourth

Final

Awards
Topscorer:  Justin Reid-Ross
Best Player:  Na Yubo
Best Goalkeeper:  Shunsuke Nagaoka
Fair Play:

References

External links
Official website (Qualifying 1)
Official website (Qualifying 2)
Official website (Qualifying 3)

 
2012
2012
2012
2012